The 2022–23 season is Raków Częstochowa's 101st season in existence and the club's fourth consecutive season in the top flight of Polish football. In addition to the domestic league, Raków Częstochowa participated in this season's edition of the Polish Cup, the Polish Super Cup, and the UEFA Europa Conference League. The season covers the period from 1 July 2022 to 30 June 2023.

Players

First-team squad

Out on loan

Other players under contract

Pre-season and friendlies

Competitions

Overview

Ekstraklasa

League table

Results summary

Results by round

Matches
The league fixtures were announced on 1 June 2022.

Polish Cup

Polish Super Cup

UEFA Europa Conference League

Second qualifying round

Third qualifying round

Play-off round

References

Raków Częstochowa
2022–23 UEFA Europa Conference League participants seasons